Nieuw-Balinge is a village in the Dutch province of Drenthe. It is a part of the municipality of Midden-Drenthe, and lies about 10 km northeast of Hoogeveen.

History 
The village was first mentioned in 1899 as Balinge (Nieuw), and means "new Balinge". Around 1860, a canal was dug to excavate the peat in the region and a village of sod houses was established.

In 1954, a small Dutch Reformed church was built in the village. Between 1952 and 1961, there was an ammunition depot. The bunkers have remained and one is now in used by bats.

Gallery

References

Midden-Drenthe
Populated places in Drenthe